Pink Panther and Pals is an American animated television series and a modern adaptation of the classic DePatie-Freleng Pink Panther shorts from the 1960s. The program was produced for Boomerang by Desert Panther Production and Rubicon Studios in association with The Mirisch Company and MGM Television. It premiered on March 7, 2010.

Like the classic cartoon show, the program is composed of two seven-minute Pink Panther shorts and a seven-minute Ant and the Aardvark short in between, retaining the main characters in both shorts though with some changes.

Show premise

The Pink Panther 
The Pink Panther shorts are reminiscent of the classic DePatie-Freleng shorts from the 1960s and the 1970s, from art direction, silent acting, musical scoring, and story lines. The Pink Panther remains silent throughout the show, and appears as a teenager.  The Little Man was renamed "Big Nose" for this series, being voiced by Alex Nussbaum. Pink Panther's horse and Big Nose's lovable canine companion were reintroduced as well.

The Ant and the Aardvark 
The Ant and the Aardvark is based on the classic DePatie-Freleng shorts. In this version, the Aardvark's Jewish sense of humor and Jackie Mason-esque voice (portrayed by Eddie Garvar and occasionally John Over) from his classic counterpart remains; a new, younger ant (voiced by Kel Mitchell) has replaced the Dean Martin-esque "Charlie" from the original shorts. The series now takes place in a jungle, and new characters are introduced in the series.

Characters 

 The Pink Panther: The protagonist of the series. He is a cool and collected character who always seems to rub Big Nose the wrong way. As in the classic series, he is a mostly a silent protagonist.
 Big Nose: Based on the original "Little Man" from the classic series. He is the neighbor and a rival of the Pink Panther. He's depicted as short, with a big nose and a mustache, and is plain white in color. He loves the color blue as much as the Panther loves his favorite color, pink. He is often rude and likes to brag a lot making his relationship with the Panther very complex. He owns an unnamed pet dog who, unlike his master, has almost no problem with the Pink Panther at all. He speaks gibberish.
 Hoarse: The Pink Panther's white horse, based on a horse that gave him trouble in several cartoons of the classic series.
 Dog: Big Nose's white dog who is cute and lovable, but dangerous. Like his master, he is a plain white color and not very outstanding. He is also a rival of the Pink Panther and is not always fond of him. But from time to time he has shown to enjoy the Pink Panther's activities, such as music and dancing.
 Ant: A small red ant, and one of the title characters of "The Ant and the Aardvark" sketches. He is quite sharp and intelligent and, like real-life ants, is physically very strong, being able to carry objects many times his weight. His remarks towards and about Aardvark are somewhat more sharp and sarcastic than in his previous laid-back incarnations.
 The Blue Aardvark: A blue aardvark, who is one of the main characters as well as being the main antagonist in "The Ant and the Aardvark" sketches. Like real aardvarks, he wants to eat the Ant. He's sly, sneaky and uses the fourth wall; he frequently addresses the audience as to what's going on.
 Eli: An elephant who is a friend of the Ant and on many occasions protects the Ant from the Aardvark.

Voice cast 
 Kel Mitchell as Ant 
 Eddie Garvar as Aardvark, Eli
 Alex Nussbaum as Big Nose, Horse, Dog, Narrator, Big Nose's wife, Dog Tracker, Hedgehog, Chef on TV, Bear, Pig, Lion, Croc 1 and 2, Grampy, Italian Chef, Radio VO, Alien, Skunks, Walrus, Mockingbird Mike, Leopard
 Jeannie Elias as Genius, Female Spy
 John Over as Aardvark, Eli
 Bob Spang as Gracie Gorilla, Rowdy Rhino, Mitey Mite

Episodes

Broadcast 
In the US, the show aired on Cartoon Network and ended on August 23, 2010, after that, Cartoon Network rerun this series and officially ended rerun in 2012. The series also aired on the US Boomerang somewhere in 2011 or 12. The series had its Canada premiere on Teletoon on May 11 and began airing in the UK & Ireland on Boomerang on April 19. The show also premiered in the Middle East and Africa on Boomerang on September 11. American program block KidsClick picked up reruns of the show on July 1, 2017, until its demise on March 31, 2019.

In other media 

 
In the Gummibär & Friends: The Gummy Bear Show episode "Sleepwalker", Granny Peters, Harry and Kala can be seen watching an episode of Pink Panther and Pals.

References

External links 
 
 

2010 American television series debuts
2010 American television series endings
2010s American animated television series
American children's animated comedy television series
Animated television series about mammals
English-language television shows
Cartoon Network original programming
American flash animated television series
KidsClick
Television series by MGM Television
The Pink Panther (cartoons) television series
Child versions of cartoon characters
Animated television series reboots